The Navy Line is a line common to a number of rail systems. See

Barcelona metro line 6, Barcelona, Spain
Trinity Railway Express, Dallas, Texas
Seoul Subway Line 1, Seoul, South Korea